Petersburg Historic District may refer to:

Petersburg Historic District (Petersburg, Illinois), listed on the National Register of Historic Places in Menard County, Illinois
Petersburg Historic District (Petersburg, Tennessee), listed on the National Register of Historic Places in Fayette County, Tennessee